The discography of Ai Otsuka, a Japanese singer-songwriter, contains eight studio albums, two compilation albums, eleven live DVD albums, and twenty-two singles.

Studio albums

Mini-albums

Compilation albums

Live albums

Remix albums

Singles

Other

In other works
Love for Nana: Only 1 Tribute (March 16, 2005)
"Cherish/大塚 愛 for Trapnest" (also included on her Love Cook album) 
Tokyo Friends: The Movie music collection (August 23, 2006)
Six tracks performed by the fictional band "Survival Company"
"to me" (cover of Boo Bee Benz) 
"ちょっと" (Chotto, original track)
"フレンズ -サバカンver.-" (Friends: Sabakan ver., included in sixth single)
"君という花" (Kimi to Iu Hana, cover of Boo Bee Benz)
"ハリケーン" (Hurricane, original track)
"tears -サバカンver.-" (Tears: Sabakan ver., alternate version of the B-side of Yumekui).
Judy and Mary 15th Anniversary Tribute Album (released March 18, 2009)
"Lover Soul" (cover) 
 Watashi to Drecom -DREAMS COME TRUE 25th ANNIVERSARY BEST COVERS- (March 26, 2014)
"Romance" (cover)

DVDs
 (July 27, 2005)
 (July 26, 2006)
Love is Born: 3rd Anniversary 2006 (January 1, 2007)
 (September 26, 2007)
Love Is Born: 4th Anniversary 2007 (January 1, 2008)
 (July 30, 2008)
Love Is Born: 5th Anniversary 2008 (February 25, 2009)
 (May 6, 2009)
 (September 23, 2009)
Love Is Born: 6th Anniversary 2009 (March 17, 2010)
Love is Best Tour 2009 Final (June 2, 2010)
Love Is Born: 7th Anniversary 2010 (March 9, 2011)
Love Is Born: 10th Anniversary 2013 (March 19, 2014)
Love Fantastic Tour 2014: Ōtsuka Ai wa Mahōtsukāi (おぉーつかあいはまほぉーつかぁい) (December 17, 2014)
ai otsuka LIVE BOX 2015: TRiCKY BORNBON (January 20, 2016)
Love Is Born: 13th Anniversary 2016 (December 21, 2016)
Love Is Born: 14th Anniversary 2017 (December 20, 2017)
Love Honey Tour 2017: Yuuwaku no Kaori ni Yuu Wakuwaku (誘惑の香りにYOUワクワク) (September 5, 2018)
Love Is Born: 16th Anniversary 2019 (January 15, 2020)
Love Is Born: 17th Anniversary 2020 (February 3, 2021)

Theme songs and tie-ins
"Momo no Hanabira" – theme song for Suika
"Sakuranbo" – featured in the game Taiko no Tatsujin Po~taboru by Namco and Drummania V by Konami
"Pretty Voice" – theme song for Shoubu Shitagi' (aka Division 1 Stage 1)
"Kuroge Wagyuu Joshio Tanyaki 680 Yen" – ending song for Black Jack"Friends" – theme song for Tokyo Friends, the drama Otsuka starred in.
"Planetarium" – image song for Hana yori Dango"Yumekui" – theme song for the Tokyo Friends movie
"Ren'ai Shashin" – theme song for the movie Tada, Kimi o Aishiteru"Chu-Lip" – theme song for the drama Kirakira Kenshui"Cherish" – theme song for Love for Nana"Peach" – ending theme song for Hanazakari no Kimitachi e"Peach" – featured in the game Taiko no Tatsujin 2 by Namco and Drummania V'' by Konami
 "Bye Bye" – song for Asahi Slat 2009 TVCM 
 "Lucky Star" – theme Song for Vancouver Olympic winter game 2010 (on TV Fuji)
 "Zokkondition" – song for Asahi Slat 2010 TVCM
 "Chime" – Fruits Basket: 1st Season 2nd Opening Song

See also
Love (Ai Otsuka)#Discography

References

Discographies of Japanese artists
Pop music discographies
Discography